Hillclimbing is a problem faced by railway systems when a load must be carried up an incline. While railways have a great ability to haul very heavy loads, this advantage is only significant when the tracks are fairly level. As soon as the gradients increase, the tonnage that can be hauled is greatly diminished.

History 
Early tramways and railways were laid out with very gentle grades because locomotive and horse haulage were so low in tractive effort. The only exception would be with a line that was downhill all the way for loaded traffic. Brakes were very primitive at this early stage.

Where a railway has to cross a range of mountains, it is important to lower the summit as much as possible, as this reduces the steepness of the gradients on either side. This can be done with a summit tunnel or a deep summit cutting.

A summit tunnel can lower the summit even more, and steeper hills result in shorter tunnels. Also, tunnels cost the same no matter how much overburden there is, while cuttings tend to increase in cost with the square of the overburden.

Care had to be taken with summit tunnels in the early days of steam with designs that suffered from problems with smoke and slippery rail.

Ruling gradient 

The ruling gradient of a section of railway line between two major stations is the gradient of the steepest stretch. The ruling gradient governs the tonnage of the load that the locomotive can haul reliably.

Techniques to overcome steep hills 
Some of the techniques that can be used to overcome steep hills include:
 dividing the load or splitting the train, which requires a siding at the summit. 
 attaching additional banking engine(s).
 Using multiple units to divide the load on tractive wheels.
 replacing the engine with a more powerful heavier engine for the duration of the steep grade.
 strengthening the track on or approaching the steep grade, allowing higher speeds, and allowing the train a run at the gradient. This can be used in short underwater tunnels, where there is a steep descent just before the climb.
 using two-in-one articulated locomotives such as the Fairlie, Garratt or Mallet locomotive.
 using a booster engine, though this is usually limited to starting the heavy train.
 Zig zags
 Spirals
 Horseshoe curves
 Rack railway
 Fell mountain railway system
 Elevators, cable railways, or funicular railways driven by stationary engines (cable haulage up and down inclines).
 Geared steam locomotives such as a Shay locomotive
 Atmospheric railway
 Cable car (railway)
 Rail surface treatment
 Compensation for curvature - the gradient is slightly eased on sharpest curves so that the tractive effort to pull the train is uniform.

See also 

 Cable car
 Funicular railway
 Grade (slope)
 Lickey Incline
 Mountain railway
 Rack railway
 Ruling gradient
 Slope
 Steepest gradients on adhesion railways

Rail technologies